The Kerrang! Awards are an annual music awards show in the United Kingdom, founded by the music magazine Kerrang! and focusing primarily on rock music. The annual awards features performances by prominent artists, and some of the awards of more popular interest are presented in a televised ceremony.

Unlike many major music awards shows, the nominees and winners of the Kerrang! Awards are determined by fan votes.

History
Since they began in 1994, the Kerrang! Awards became one of Britain's most recognised award events by the now-defunct Guinness Book of British Hit Singles & Albums, often listing some of the winners in their annual round-up of the previous year. The event is presented by major music celebrities, with many others outside the industry who attend the event, sometimes presenting the awards with one example being Jodie Marsh in 2003 presenting Feeder with their Best British Band award. 

Perhaps one of the notable events of recent years was the ceremony of 2000, in which Slipknot set fire to their table after winning Best Band in the World. Lostprophets nearly became the first act to win three times in succession the Best British Band award, but lost to Bullet for My Valentine in 2008, who later achieved the succession in 2010. It has since been suggested, that since Ian Watkins' conviction, Lostprophets awards should be rescinded.  Thirty Seconds to Mars holds the record for most Best Single wins at three. The band is also the first artist to win Best Single in two consecutive years at the Kerrang! Awards 2007 and Kerrang! Awards 2008. Many international companies, including Island Records, Orange Music Electronic Company and Marshall Amplification, are involved in the sponsorship of the various award categories.

It has been noted that the awards sometimes do not adhere to a strict "biggest is best" code, as some of the winners and nominees for the newer awards, such as Best International Newcomer, have been awarded to bands with either minor exposure or a strong live reputation, such as 2010 Best International Newcomer winners Trash Talk. There have also been controversial winners of these awards. An example of this being the winners of Best British Newcomer and Best International Newcomer, from the 2006 event (Bring Me the Horizon and Aiden). However, most of the categories ever since the first ceremony in 1993 have honored artists who have experienced notable commercial chart success at the time of winning their award, with Best British Band, Best International Band and Hall of Fame being examples.

Winning an award has been seen as an important achievement and event of an artist career, with Feeder's frontman Grant Nicholas saying that their 2003 accolade, was the award their late drummer Jon Lee had always wanted the band to win, with Nicholas dedicating the award to him. That same year, Justin Hawkins of the Darkness expressed his disappointment at not winning Best British Newcomer, as it would have meant the band winning every award they were nominated for, only to have this denied by Funeral for a Friend.

The 23rd Kerrang! Awards were held on 13 June 2014, at the Troxy in Stepney, in the East End borough of Tower Hamlets.

The awards ceremony did not take place in 2017, but returned in June 2018 with the likes of Neck Deep, Enter Shikari, Code Orange and Foo Fighters collecting awards, while the event also featured several special guests including Johnny Depp and Justin Hawkins. The event was not broadcast on TV but several acceptance speeches and interviews were uploaded to Kerrang's YouTube channel, and the ceremony naturally received heavy coverage in the following week's edition of the magazine.

The Kerrang! Awards 2019 took place on 19 June 2019. They did not take place in 2020 or 2021 due to the COVID-19 pandemic, but the ceremony was due to return in June 2022, with the reader nominations period beginning in April 2022.

Categories
As of the 2018 ceremony, the following awards were presented at the Kerrang! Awards.

Best Song (formerly 'Best Single')
Best Album
Best British Band
Best International Band
Best British Breakthrough
Best International Breakthrough
Best British Live Act
Best International Live Act
Kerrang! Legend
Kerrang! Inspiration
Kerrang! Icon

Television broadcasts
The first time the awards were televised, was in 2001 via a recording on Channel 5 in the UK, with Channel 4 also showing a recording at late-nights until 2004.  The 2007 awards were televised on the now-defunct Hits music channel, and the 2008 awards were televised on the new 4Music music channel, owned by Channel 4. In the award's early days, MTV UK and MTV Europe would show the award winners collect their award alongside an interview. Since 2001, the award ceremonies have been televised on Kerrang! TV. However, the 2018 ceremony did not air on TV. More recently, the ceremony has been streamed live on YouTube, with highlights later being uploaded to Kerrangs channel.

See also

 List of Kerrang! Award winners
 List of annual events in London

References

External links
 

 
1993 establishments in England
20th-century awards
21st-century awards
Annual events in London
Awards established in 1993
British music awards
Music in London